Deh Sheykh (also Romanized as Deh Shaikh) is a village in Qarah Chaman Rural District, Arzhan District, Shiraz County, Fars Province, Iran. At the 2006 census, its population was 257, in 57 families.

References 

Populated places in Shiraz County